Kullorsuaq Island (old spelling: Kuvdlorssuaq) is an island in the Avannaata municipality in northwestern Greenland. The name of the island means "a big thumb" in the Greenlandic language.

Geography 
Part of the Upernavik Archipelago, Kullorsuaq Island is located in the southern part of Melville Bay, to the north of the much larger Kiatassuaq Island, and to the northwest of the mouth of Saqqarlersuup Sullua strait. A small Ikerasaa strait separates the island from the uninhabited Saqqarlersuaq Island in the east.

Devil's Thumb 

The island is rocky throughout, with a large landmark pinnacle occupying its center, the  Devil's Thumb, from which the island derives its name.

Settlement 

Home to the Kullorsuaq settlement, the island is one of the few inhabited islands in the Upernavik Archipelago, and the only such island in its northern part. The closest settlements are Nuussuaq,  to the south, and Savissivik,  to the northwest, on the other end of Melville Bay.

See also 
Melville Monument (Greenland)

References

Melville Bay
Islands of the Upernavik Archipelago